USS Shark (SS-8) was the third vessel of the U.S. Navy to bear the name. She was an early  in the service of the United States Navy, later renamed as A-7.

Shark was laid down on 11 January 1901 at Elizabethport, New Jersey in the Crescent Shipyard under the direction of Crescent's superintendent, Arthur Leopold Busch. She was launched on 19 October 1901, and commissioned on 19 September 1903 at New Suffolk, New York with Lieutenant Charles P. Nelson in command.

Early service
Over the next three and a half years, Shark operated locally at the Naval Torpedo Station at Newport, conducting firing tests with torpedoes, and participating in early research and development efforts in the field of undersea warfare. Assigned to the First Submarine Flotilla in March 1907, Shark was stationed at the United States Naval Academy at Annapolis, Maryland in the spring of 1907.

Taken to the New York Navy Yard in April 1908, she was decommissioned there on the 21 April. Loaded onto the collier , Shark and her sister ship  comprised the auxiliary's deck cargo as she proceeded, via the Suez Canal, to the Philippines. Shark was launched soon after her arrival at Cavite in July and was recommissioned on 14 August 1908.

Over the next several years, the submarine torpedo boat operated out of Cavite, interspersing training with periodic upkeep and repair work. On 17 November 1911, Shark was renamed A-7.

World War I
During World War I, A-7 and her sister ships based at Cavite and carried out patrols of the entrance to Manila Bay. In the early spring of 1917, Lieutenant, junior grade Arnold Marcus assumed command of A-7. On 24 July 1917, shortly after her engine had been overhauled, gasoline fumes ignited and caused an explosion and fire while in the course of a patrol in Manila Bay.

After Marcus and his men had battled the blaze, he ordered the crew topside and into the boats that had been summoned alongside. The last man to emerge from the interior of the crippled submersible, Marcus sent up distress signals to the nearby monitor  and then took the helm himself in an attempt to beach the ship. He refused medical treatment until all his men had been attended to and he had to be ordered to leave his post. Marcus and six of his crew died the next day, 25 July 1917, from the effects of the explosion and fire that had ravaged A-7. The last remaining member of the crew, Fireman Second Class Arthur M. Jacobs, succumbed to his injuries on 1 August 1917. The Navy recognized Marcus' heroism by naming the destroyer  in his honor.

Later service
Placed in ordinary at Cavite on 1 April 1918, A-7 was decommissioned as of 12 December 1919. Given the alphanumeric hull number SS-8 on 17 July 1920, A-7 — initially advertised for sale in the 16th Naval District — was subsequently authorized for use as a target in 1921. She was struck from the Naval Vessel Register on 16 January 1922.

References

 

Plunger-class submarines
Shark
Ships built in Elizabeth, New Jersey
1901 ships
Ships sunk as targets